Driving licence in Thailand is a document that allows the holder to drive on any roads in Thailand and in other ASEAN states without an International Driving Permit. The minimum age to drive a motor vehicle is 18, and to drive a motorcycle is 15. Driving licence is issued and administered by the Department of Land Transport, Ministry of Transport and its branches, land transport offices across Thailand.

All drivers must pass the driving test and obtain a probationary driving licence. Once the licence has been held for at least two years, the driver can convert it into a full public or private licence according to their choice. They can also apply for licences for heavy goods or passenger vehicles. Drivers who previously had their licence revoked, usually by a court order, must also obtain a probationary licence.

Due to the introduction of very powerful and heavy motorcycles, the Department of Land Transport is introducing a new regulation. Once the regulation is effective, drivers who want to drive a motorcycle with the power exceeding 45 kW or the engine larger than 400 cc must have an additional licence as well as more stringent training.  As of September 7 2022 this additional license is not available.

Types of Driving Licence

Civil Driving Licence 
Driving licence in Thailand is issued under two different laws: (1) Automobile Act, 1979 for small cars and motorcycle; (2) Land Transport Act, 1979 for heavy good and passenger vehicles. In accordance with the Automobile Act of 1979, driving licences may be classified as follows:

All drivers must begin by obtaining a probationary licence. Once the licence has been held for at least 2 years and they are at least 18 years old, they can apply for a full licence. Either public or private licence are available according to their choice. A private licence does not require a criminal record test, while a public licence does require a criminal record test. Anyone who has completed a sentence of imprisonment and who has been discharged for at least three years shall be considered fit for a public driving licence. A private driving licence is valid for 5 years, while a public driving licence can be used for 3 years.

The minimum age for obtaining a probationary licence is 18 years old. The exception is that a probationary motorcycle licence may be issued to people aged 15–17 years old (inclusive). For a full licence, however, the applicants must be at least 18 years old. This means the driver who obtained their probationary motorcycle licence when they are 15 must obtain the same licence again when they are 17.

Learner drivers do not need a learner's permit or similar documents, but must be accompanied by a qualified driver who has held a full licence for at least three years.

The Land Transport Act, 1979, defined different licences to be issued. These include:

The prefix A and P stands for "all types" and "personal only" respectively. The licence of the higher category can be used in place of the lower ones. The "all types" or A licences can be used instead of the "personal only" or P licences. For instance, an A4 (ท.4) licence  can be used in lieu of P4 (บ.4), A3 (ท.3), P3 (บ.3), A2 (ท.2), P2 (บ.2), A1 (ท.1) licences. An A2 licence can be used in place of P2, A1 and P1 licences.

Drivers who wish to obtain P1-P4 licences must meet the minimum age requirements as well as pass an approved course at the local transport office or approved driving school. In addition, A1-A4 licences also require a criminal record check.

The probationary car licence is, according to the legislation, not needed for P/A 1-4 licences. In practice, most drivers learning to drive large vehicles must already learnt how to drive smaller vehicles, requiring the probationary car licence. Some driving schools and land transport offices often require the probationary car licence before the driver can learn to drive a large truck.

Military Driving Licence 
Military personnel can apply for a civil driving licence and use it in their career. However, the Military Automobile Act, 1933 empowered the Department of Army Transportation to issue driving licences to soldiers. These include:

Issuance of the Driving Licence
Thailand utilises a probationary or temporary licence for new and previously disqualified drivers with less restrictions than most learner's licence systems around the world. Learner drivers in Thailand do not need a licence, but must be accompanied by a fully qualified drivers who has been holding a licence for at least 3 years. Once they are ready, they must obtain a medical certificate confirming that they are free from active tuberculosis, elephantiasis, leprosy, alcoholism, drug addiction and other potential conditions affecting the ability to drive and public safety before attending tests at the Department of Land Transport or any local land transport offices.

Physical Test 
At the test centre, the candidate must pass a physical test comprising:

 Reaction test. The candidate must press the pedal of the testing equipment until the red light shows, then they must switch their foot to the braking pedal as soon as possible. The acceptable response time is 0.75 seconds or less.
 Wide angle perception. The candidate must place their face against the testing machine, looking forward, then tell the colour as seen from either left or right eye.
 Depth perception. The equipment consists of two white rods, one stationary (on the right) and another movable (on the left). The stationary rod is kept lit while the movable rod is not lit. The aim is to move the left rod such that its brightness is equal to the right rod. In other words, two rods are parallel if they have equal irradiance.
 Colour blindness test. The candidate must specify the correct colour as shown on the equipment. Some test centres use traffic light, while others use testing chart. This is the most controversial part of the test, as many colour blind people are disqualified from the test at this stage, forcing them to drive without a licence and have to be punished. Thailand's National Human Rights Commission argued that most colour blind people can drive safely, but there was no positive response from the Department of Land Transport.

Theory Test 
Once the physical test is completed, the candidate must attend a 5-hour lecture (1 day) comprising driving etiquettes, defensive driving, related laws and other useful topics. For larger vehicles, the lecture lasts 10 hours (2 days). When the lecture is completed, the candidate sit the theory test at the same day or the next working day. The exam contains 50 items and the passing score is 45. Prior to 2014, the passing score was 35. If the candidate fails in the theory test, they must attend the later test according to the instructions.

Driving Test 
After passing the theory test, a candidate must pass the driving test off-road. There are 7 different manoeuvres but the test centre selects only 3 of them. These include

Car and Large Vehicles 

 Stopping at the kerbside safely and legally. The distance between the left wheels and the kerb must not exceed 25 cm.
 Progressing and reversing in a narrow course.
 Reverse parking into the bay on the left.
 Stopping and starting on the hill. (Not used for Automatic Car).
 Making a u-turn within a specified course.
 Making a left or right turn within a specified course.
 Driving in accordance with signage.

Motorcycle 

 Driving in accordance with signage.
 Driving on a small pathway.
 Driving on a Z-shaped path.
 Driving on an S-shaped path.
 Driving on a training course.

The highlighted manoeuvres are usually selected by most test centres. If the driver passes all the manoeuvres, they will be issued with a probationary driving licence. On the other hand, drivers who fail to pass one or more manoeuvres must get the appointment slip and attend the test again. The interval between two consecutive tests must be 3 days or more, or as specified by the invigilator. The overall process, from the application to the issuance of the licence, must not exceed 90 days.

Since the appointment slots at land transport offices in large provinces are often occupied for many months, some learner drivers may attend an approved driving school, available locally, or the Land Transport School in Bangkok and Pathum Thani. The process is roughly the same as those who choose to attend the testing centre. However, the driver must undergo at least 10 hours of driving practice, both off-road and on-road in addition to 5 hours of theory training. After the completion of programme, the driver must pass both theory and practical test, overseen by approved invigilators. The practical test at most driving schools is usually less stringent than that at the land transport office, as there is no three-day interval between failed and successful test. If the driver fail to complete a manoeuvre, they can get extra training and try again. The school then issue proof of completion to the learner, who then visit the land transport office to have their licences issued.

Driving school must maintain standards set by the Department of Land Transport, such as having qualified driving teachers and a suitable driving course. The programme used by private driving school must strictly follow one used by the government-run Land Transport School.

Extension of the licence
Full driving licence may be extended once its validity is less than 6 months. Probationary licence holders may upgrade their licence once they have held the licence for at least one year. Previously, a full licence may be extended once its validity is 90 days or less, while a probationary licence can be exchanged for a full licence if it is valid for 60 days or less. Regardless of timeframe, the driver must pass a physical test again in order to be able to hold a further licence. If the licence has expired for less than a year, the process remains the same. If, however, the licence has expired for more than 1 but less than 3 years, the holder must attend the lecture and pass the theory test. Complete test is needed if the licence has expired for 3 years or more.

Fees
As of 2021, the fees payable are dependent on the validity of the licence. For a licence under the Automobile Act, the annual fee is ฿100 for cars and ฿50 for motorcycles and other vehicles. There is an additional charge of ฿5 for paperwork. For A and P licences issued under the Land Transport Act, the annual fee is ฿50, plus an additional charge of ฿50. For example,

If the licence is lost, stolen or significantly defaced, the driver should apply for a replacement within 15 days. For car and motorcycle licences issued under the Automobile Act, the replacement fee is half the original fee (excluding paperwork charge); the maximum payable charge is capped at ฿100. Again, a paperwork charge of ฿5 is still applicable. For A and P licences, a replacement costs ฿30. To sum up, the following table shows the replacement cost of driving licences.

These fees do not include other expenses, such as tuition fees charged by driving schools and medical/criminal certificate fees.

See also
 Vehicle registration plates of Thailand

Notes

References

Thailand
Road transport in Thailand